Pinsot is a former commune in the Isère department in southeastern France. On 1 January 2019, it was merged into the new commune Le Haut-Bréda.

Population

Sights
 The Iron Route of Pinsot (Le Sentier du Fer de Pinsot) is a forest trail leading visitors to discover the old mining industry of the town. Historic sites such as minors houses, disaffected mines and cinders can be seen.
 Le Cohard is a hamlet which is the starting point for many hiking trails into the Gleyzin mountain in the Belledonne massif.

Born in Pinsot 
 Jules David (1848-1923), photographer

See also 
 Communes of the Isère department

References 

Former communes of Isère
Isère communes articles needing translation from French Wikipedia